The Mercedes-Benz F-Cell Roadster is a concept car produced by the German car company Mercedes-Benz. During April 2009, the concept car has traveled the Bertha Benz Memorial Route thus celebrating the exploits of Mrs. Bertha Benz in 1888.

It has an electric motor powered by a fuel cell located at the rear of a power of 1.2 kW (1.63 hp). Found inside the vehicle the following elements: a joystick replacing the conventional wheel and bucket seats in carbon fiber. The design is meant to resemble a Horseless Carriage and references the original Benz Patent-Motorwagen with large diameter and thin spoked wheels.

See also
 Hydrogen vehicle
 Hydrogen economy

References

External links
Mercedes-Benz F-CELL Roadster
Mercedes-Benz F-CELL Roadster Powertrain

F-Cell Roadster
Hydrogen cars
Fuel cell vehicles